Arthur Lee Conley (January 4, 1946 – November 17, 2003), also known in later years as Lee Roberts, was an American soul singer, best known for the 1967 hit "Sweet Soul Music".

Early  life 
Conley was born in McIntosh County, Georgia, U.S., and grew up in Atlanta. He first recorded in 1959 as the lead singer of Arthur & the Corvets. With this group, he released three singles in 1963 and 1964—"Poor Girl", "I Believe", and "Flossie Mae"—on the Atlanta-based record label, NRC Records.

Biography and career
In 1964, he moved to a new label (Baltimore's Ru-Jac Records) and released "I'm a Lonely Stranger". When Otis Redding heard this, he asked Conley to record a new version, which was released on Redding's own fledgling label Jotis Records, as only its second release.  Conley met Redding in 1967. Together they rewrote the Sam Cooke song "Yeah Man" into "Sweet Soul Music", which, at Redding's insistence, was released on the Atco-distributed label Fame Records, and was recorded at FAME studios in Muscle Shoals, Alabama. It proved to be a massive hit, going to the number two position on the U.S. charts and the Top Ten across much of Europe. "Sweet Soul Music" sold over one million copies, and was awarded a gold disc.

After several years of hit singles in the early 1970s, he relocated to England in 1975, and spent several years in Belgium, settling in Amsterdam (Netherlands) in spring 1977. At the beginning of 1980 he had some major performances as Lee Roberts and the Sweaters in the Ganzenhoef, Paradiso, De Melkweg and the Concertgebouw, and was highly successful. At the end of 1980 he moved to the Dutch town of Ruurlo legally changing his name to Lee Roberts—his middle name and his mother's maiden name. He promoted new music via his Art-Con Productions company. Amongst the bands he promoted was the heavy metal band Shockwave from The Hague. A live performance on January 8, 1980, featuring Lee Roberts & the Sweaters, was released as an album entitled Soulin in 1988.

Personal life
Conley was gay, and several music writers have said that his homosexuality was a bar to greater success in the United States and one of the reasons behind his move to Europe and his eventual name change. In 2014, rock historian Ed Ward wrote, "[Conley] headed to Amsterdam and changed his name to Lee Roberts. Nobody knew 'Lee Roberts,' and at last Conley was able to live in peace with a secret he had hidden—or thought he had—for his entire career: he was gay. But nobody in The Netherlands cared."

Death
Conley died at the age of 57 from intestinal cancer in Ruurlo, The Netherlands in November 2003. He was buried in Vorden.

Discography
Albums

 Sweet Soul Music (Atlantic, 1967)
 Shake, Rattle & Roll (Atlantic, 1967)
 Soul Directions (1968)
 More Sweet Soul (1969)

Singles
"I Believe" (1963, as Arthur & the Corvets)
"Flossie Mae" (1963, as Arthur & the Corvets)
"Poor Girl" (1963, as Arthur & the Corvets)
"Where He Leads Me" / "I'm A Lonely Stranger" (1965)
"Who's Fooling Who" / "There's A Place For Us" (1966)
"I Can't Stop (No, No, No)" / "In The Same Old Way" (1966)
"I'm Gonna Forget About You" (1966)
"Sweet Soul Music" / "Let's Go Steady" (1967, co-written with Otis Redding, #2 R&B, #2 pop)
"Whole Lotta Woman" / "Love Comes And Goes" (1967, #73 Pop)
"Ha! Ha! Ha! Ha!" (1967)
"Shake, Rattle & Roll" (1967, #31 pop, #20 R&B)
"Ob-La-Di, Ob-La-Da" / "Otis Sleep On" (1968, #51 pop, #41 R&B, Beatles cover featuring guitar by Duane Allman)
"Aunt Dora's Love Soul Shack" (1968)
"Funky Street" / "Put Our Love Together" (1968)
"People Sure Act Funny" (1968, Top 20 R&B)
"Burning Fire" (1968)
"Is That You Love" (1968)
"Run On (1968)
"Star Review" (1969, with Tom Dowd, written by Allen Toussaint)
"They Call the Wind Maria" (1969)
"Day-O" (1969, made famous by Harry Belafonte)
"God Bless" (1970, Top 40 R&B)
"I'm Living Good" (1971)
"Walking on Eggs" / "More Sweet Soul Music" (1972)
"Rita" (1972)
"It's So Nice (When It's Someone Else's Wife)" (1974)

References

External links
 Memorial website (in Dutch) Photos from Arthur's last live performance, 9 June 2002 in Netherlands.
 Arthur Conley Sweet Soul Music Home Page w/ CD Liner Notes, Discography and Latest Releases
 Yoni's Home of Soul Music page on Conley, w/ info about unreleased tracks
 
 Otis Redding's biography contains history of Jotis Records
 Answers.com article on Arthur Conley
 Arthur Conley Dies

1946 births
2003 deaths
American soul musicians
American expatriates in Belgium
American expatriates in the Netherlands
American expatriates in England
Deaths from colorectal cancer
Deaths from cancer in the Netherlands
Atlantic Records artists
Atco Records artists
LGBT people from Georgia (U.S. state)
American LGBT singers
American gay musicians
Musicians from Atlanta
People from McIntosh County, Georgia
LGBT African Americans
20th-century American LGBT people
21st-century American LGBT people
20th-century African-American male singers